Alexandre Daigle (born February 7, 1975) is a Canadian former professional ice hockey player. A highly touted junior prospect, Daigle was drafted first overall in the 1993 NHL Entry Draft by the Ottawa Senators. After recording a modest career high of 51 points in three separate National Hockey League (NHL) regular seasons, Daigle briefly retired from hockey at age 25, but returned to the NHL two years later. Though he played 10 seasons in the NHL and four in the NL, he failed to live up to the high expectations put forth when he was drafted first overall, and is therefore regarded by many to have been a draft bust.

Playing career

Amateur career
As a youth, Daigle played in the 1988 Quebec International Pee-Wee Hockey Tournament with a minor ice hockey team from Laval, Quebec.

NHL career
Leading up to the 1993 NHL Entry Draft, Daigle was considered a "can't miss" prospect and NHL superstar-in-waiting. The Senators were even accused of deliberately losing games late in the 1992–93 season, their first in the NHL, in order to guarantee the first overall selection and the right to draft him. This prompted an investigation by the NHL, who soon implemented a draft lottery to prevent such things from happening again. The Senators subsequently finished last place overall in the 1992–93 league standings, thus securing the rights to the first overall pick.

As the draft approached, the Quebec Nordiques, who were hosting the event, were reportedly so eager to draft the next Quebecois superstar that they were rumored to have offered star players such as Owen Nolan, Peter Forsberg, Ron Hextall, and draft picks, but Ottawa management disregarded all offers. The Senators selected Daigle first overall, ahead of future Hall-of-Famers Chris Pronger and Paul Kariya. He subsequently received the largest starting salary in league history (five years, $12.25 million), leading to the introduction of a rookie salary cap a few years later. Regarding his draft position, Daigle uttered the now infamous comment, "I'm glad I got drafted first, because no one remembers number two". Chris Pronger, selected with the second pick by the Hartford Whalers, was elected to the Hockey Hall of Fame in 2015.

Daigle initially seemed destined to live up to the pre-draft hype, scoring 20 goals and 51 points in a rookie season in which he had little offensive support, and his 37 points in the lockout-shortened 1994-95 season had him on pace for 28 goals & 66 points in an 84 game schedule. However, he was never able to reproduce his junior dominance, and the superstardom the Senators and the league had hoped for never materialized. He scored 20 or more goals twice – in his rookie year and in 1996–97, never registering more than 26 goals in a season. He was frequently criticized for lack of effort and motivation, with his lucrative long-term contract perhaps partially to blame. He seemed interested in the limelight, appearing in a full-page ad dressed in a nurse's uniform.

Russian center Alexei Yashin outplayed Daigle in every season that they were teammates in Ottawa. Both entered the league in the 1993–94 season and were promoted as future stars of the franchise, displayed on the cover of the Senators' yearbook and media guide. Management, however, supported Daigle over Yashin, touting him over Yashin for the Calder Memorial Trophy (though Yashin ended up receiving a nomination instead of Daigle). After management continued to support Daigle despite his subpar performance, an angered Yashin held out in the 1995–96 season unless his contract was renegotiated to pay him at a level similar to Daigle's. Head coach Rick Bowness and assistant coach Alain Vigneault were fired on November 21, 1995, after demoting Daigle to the fourth line.

On September 25, 1996, Daigle was removed from a team flight when, while chatting with a flight attendant aboard USAir Flight 1948, he leaned over to Trevor Timmins (then the Senators' Director Of Team Services) and said, "Watch out for your bomb there" while motioning towards Timmins' laptop computer. Upon hearing Daigle's comment, the flight attendant notified the captain, who immediately contacted USAir ground control, and police were subsequently notified. What Daigle did not know was that then-U.S. President Bill Clinton was also on the Pittsburgh International Airport's tarmac at the time, resulting in a heightened level of security. Daigle was not prosecuted for the incident, but was fined $300 and barred from boarding the connecting flight to Tampa with the rest of the team.

During the 1997–98 season, after four and a half seasons, 74 goals and 172 points in 301 games played, Ottawa finally soured on Daigle and traded him to the Philadelphia Flyers in exchange for prospect Václav Prospal and another first-round bust, Pat Falloon. With the Flyers, Daigle scored 31 points in 68 games. In January 1999, Philadelphia traded Daigle to the Edmonton Oilers, who later that same day traded him to the Tampa Bay Lightning for Alexander Selivanov. Daigle played only 32 games for the Lightning, collecting six goals and six assists for 12 points. The New York Rangers then acquired Daigle as a reclamation project, sending cash to the Lightning, but they too realized the one-time junior superstar was not living up to expectations and waived him at the end of the season. In 58 games with the Rangers, Daigle recorded just 8 goals and 18 assists for 26 points.

Daigle found himself out of hockey by the age of 25. No one was willing to take a chance on the under-achiever, and in fact, Daigle admitted he had no desire to play the game anymore. In an interview on Radio-Canada, he said he never wanted to play hockey, but stuck to the game because of his talent. Instead, he became interested in the entertainment business and the opportunity to be a celebrity. He played hockey in a small league in Los Angeles with Cuba Gooding Jr. on Jerry Bruckheimer's team, the Bad Boys, and created an event promotion company, Impostor Entertainment, with former Montreal Expos pitcher Derek Aucoin. Their first project was a concert featuring Sheryl Crow during the Canadian Grand Prix Formula One auto race in Montreal.

Following a two-year absence from hockey and in need of a steady paycheque, Daigle decided to attempt an NHL comeback. In mid-2002, he contacted numerous teams looking for an invitation to training camp, ultimately signing with the Pittsburgh Penguins. Daigle would lead the Penguins in pre-season scoring, earning himself a spot on the Pittsburgh roster to start the season. Despite his impressive training camp, Daigle was unable to continue his success into the regular season, ultimately spending the better part of the season with the team's AHL affiliate in Wilkes-Barre/Scranton. After his contract was not renewed by the Penguins, Daigle signed as a free agent with the Minnesota Wild in the offseason.

After arriving in Minnesota, Daigle impressed the Wild coaching staff enough to earn a roster spot for opening night. Over the course of the 2003–04 season, Daigle managed to match his career high point total, finishing the campaign with 51 points (20 goals and 31 assists) to lead the team in scoring. During this season, he was also the Wild's nominee for the Bill Masterton Memorial Trophy, given annually to an NHL player who best exemplifies the qualities of perseverance, sportsmanship and dedication to hockey. On March 6, 2006, Minnesota waived Daigle and reassigned him to the team's AHL affiliate, the Houston Aeros. Daigle did not play a game for the Aeros, and was subsequently loaned to the AHL's Manchester Monarchs on March 13, 2006, in exchange for forward Brendan Bernakevitch.

Post NHL-career
Aware that his NHL career was over, Daigle set his sights on Europe. On May 5, 2006, he signed a two-year contract with Davos, a top team in the Swiss National League A, and inked a two-year extension with them in December. During his three complete seasons playing in Davos, the team won the league championship on two occasions. In a little over three seasons with Davos, Daigle played 137 games, tallying 46 goals and 94 assists for 140 points (averaging a little over one point per game).

On October 26, 2009, Daigle was loaned to the SCL Tigers in exchange for Oliver Setzinger. Daigle played 25 games with the SCL Tigers in the 2009–10 season, with 7 goals and 17 assists for 24 points. Daigle ranked seventh on the team in points while playing in fewer than half as many games as the team's other top scorers.

On March 23, 2010, Daigle and Davos agreed to have his contract reduced from five years to three years, making him a free agent after the 2009–10 season.

Post-playing career
Since the completion of his European hockey career, Daigle has worked in the movie industry, running studios for MTL Grandé.

Personal life
Daigle lives in Montreal with his wife and their three children.

Career statistics

Regular season and playoffs

International

Awards
1991–92: CHL – Rookie of the Year (Canadian Major Junior)
1991–92: QMJHL – Second All-Star Team
 1991–92: QMJHL – Michel Bergeron Trophy (Top Rookie Forward)
1992–93: CHL Top Draft Prospect (Canadian Major Junior)
1992–93: QMJHL – Mike Bossy Trophy (Top Draft Prospect)
 1992–93: QMJHL – First All-Star Team

Transactions
 June 26, 1993: Ottawa Senators 1st round draft choice (1st overall) in the 1993 NHL Entry Draft.
 January 17, 1998: traded by the Ottawa Senators to the Philadelphia Flyers in exchange for Václav Prospal, Pat Falloon and Dallas' 1998 2nd round draft choice.
 January 29, 1999: traded by the Philadelphia Flyers to the Edmonton Oilers in exchange for Andrei Kovalenko.
 January 29, 1999: traded by the Edmonton Oilers to the Tampa Bay Lightning in exchange for Alexander Selivanov.
 October 3, 1999: traded by the Tampa Bay Lightning to the New York Rangers in exchange for cash.
 August 13, 2002: signed as a free agent with the Pittsburgh Penguins.
 September 30, 2003: signed as a free agent with the Minnesota Wild.
 May 5, 2006: signed a 2-year contract with Davos.

References

External links
 

1975 births
Living people
Canadian expatriate ice hockey players in Switzerland
Canadian ice hockey right wingers
Canadian people of French descent
French Quebecers
Hartford Wolf Pack players
HC Davos players
HC Forward-Morges players
HC Fribourg-Gottéron players
Ice hockey people from Quebec
Manchester Monarchs (AHL) players
Minnesota Wild players
National Hockey League first-overall draft picks
National Hockey League first-round draft picks
New York Rangers players
Ottawa Senators draft picks
Ottawa Senators players
Philadelphia Flyers players
Pittsburgh Penguins players
SCL Tigers players
Sportspeople from Laval, Quebec
Tampa Bay Lightning players
Victoriaville Tigres players
Wilkes-Barre/Scranton Penguins players